The following are the national records in athletics in Central African Republic maintained by Central African Republic's national athletics federation: Fédération Centrafricaine d'Athlétisme (FCA).

Outdoor

Key to tables:

h = hand timing

Men

Women

Indoor

Men

Women

References
General
World Athletics Statistic Handbook 2019: National Outdoor Records
World Athletics Statistic Handbook 2018: National Indoor Records
Specific

External links

Central African Republic
Records
Athletics